Auxa pauliani is a species of beetle in the family Cerambycidae. It was described by Breuning in 1957.

References

Auxa
Beetles described in 1957